The women's 15 km free mass start competition of the 2015 Winter Universiade was held at the Sporting Centre FIS Štrbské Pleso on January 31.

Results

References 

Women's 15km